This is a list of the 292 accepted species of the genus Crepidium Blume (1825).

a 
 Crepidium acuminatum
 Crepidium alagense
 Crepidium amabilis
 Crepidium amplectens
 Crepidium andersonii
 Crepidium angustifoveum
 Crepidium aphyllum
 Crepidium arachnoideum
 Crepidium arboricola
 Crepidium arietinum
 Crepidium aschistum
 Crepidium atratum
 Crepidium atrobrachiatum
 Crepidium atrosanguineum
 Crepidium auratum

b 
 Crepidium bahanense
 Crepidium balabacense
 Crepidium bancanoides
 Crepidium bancanum
 Crepidium bataanense
 Crepidium bengkulense
 Crepidium biauritum
 Crepidium bidentiferum
 Crepidium binabayense
 Crepidium bisepalum
 Crepidium bispiriferum
 Crepidium brachycaulos
 Crepidium brachyodontum
 Crepidium bracteosum
 Crepidium brevidentatum
 Crepidium breviscapum
 Crepidium burbidgei

c 
 Crepidium calcareum
 Crepidium calcicola
 Crepidium calophyllum
 Crepidium caricoides
 Crepidium carinatifolium
 Crepidium carrii
 Crepidium celebicum
 Crepidium chlorophrys
 Crepidium christinae
 Crepidium circaeum
 Crepidium clemensii
 Crepidium comans
 Crepidium comberi
 Crepidium commelinifolium
 Crepidium concavum
 Crepidium copelandii
 Crepidium cordanthemon
 Crepidium cordiglottis
 Crepidium crassidens
 Crepidium crassilabris
 Crepidium crenatilobum
 Crepidium cribbianum
 Crepidium cruciatum
 Crepidium cucullatum
 Crepidium cuneipetalum
 Crepidium cupreum
 Crepidium cupuliflorum
 Crepidium curvatulum
 Crepidium curviauriculatum
 Crepidium cyanobrachium

d 
 Crepidium damusicum
 Crepidium davaensis
 Crepidium decumbens
 Crepidium dentatum
 Crepidium dewildeanum
 Crepidium diploceras
 Crepidium distans
 Crepidium dolichostachyum
 Crepidium dresslerianum
 Crepidium dryadum

e 
 Crepidium elegans
 Crepidium elmeri
 Crepidium epiphyticum
 Crepidium euanthum
 Crepidium exilis

f 
 Crepidium falcifolium
 Crepidium fasciatum
 Crepidium fimbriatum
 Crepidium finetii
 Crepidium fissum
 Crepidium flammeum
 Crepidium flavescens
 Crepidium flavovirens
 Crepidium floscularium
 Crepidium foetidum
 Crepidium foliosum
 Crepidium fontinale
 Crepidium fulvum

g 
 Crepidium gibbsiae
 Crepidium godefroyi
 Crepidium graciliscapum
 Crepidium graminifolium
 Crepidium grandiflorum
 Crepidium grandifolium
 Crepidium gregorii

h 
 Crepidium hahajimense
 Crepidium hainanense
 Crepidium heliophilum
 Crepidium heliophobum
 Crepidium hippocrepiformis
 Crepidium hoi
 Crepidium holttumianum
 Crepidium horielense
 Crepidium humeratum
 Crepidium hutchinsonianum
 Crepidium hydrophilum

i 
 Crepidium imthurnii
 Crepidium incurviforceps
 Crepidium incurvum
 Crepidium inexspectatum
 Crepidium insulare
 Crepidium integrilabium
 Crepidium irregularis

j 
 Crepidium josephianum 
 Crepidium junghuhnii

k 
 Crepidium kabense
 Crepidium kandae
 Crepidium kempfii
 Crepidium kerintjiense
 Crepidium kerstingianum
 Crepidium keysseri
 Crepidium khasianum
 Crepidium kinabaluense
 Crepidium klabatense
 Crepidium klimkoanum
 Crepidium kobi
 Crepidium koordersii
 Crepidium kortylewskianum

l 
 Crepidium laciniosum
 Crepidium laeve
 Crepidium lamii
 Crepidium langkawiense
 Crepidium latilabre
 Crepidium latipetalum
 Crepidium latisegmentum
 Crepidium latisepalum
 Crepidium latum
 Crepidium lawleri
 Crepidium laxum
 Crepidium ledermannii
 Crepidium leucodon
 Crepidium lilacinum
 Crepidium lobatocallosum
 Crepidium lokonense
 Crepidium longifolium
 Crepidium longispicum
 Crepidium lowii
 Crepidium loxium
 Crepidium lunatum
 Crepidium luniferum
 Crepidium lyroglossum

m 
 Crepidium maaikeae
 Crepidium maboroensis
 Crepidium mackinnonii
 Crepidium macrochilum
 Crepidium macrophyllum
 Crepidium macrotis
 Crepidium maculatum
 Crepidium magnicallosa
 Crepidium malabarica
 Crepidium mambulilingense
 Crepidium mariae
 Crepidium marsupichilum
 Crepidium matsudae
 Crepidium maximowiczianum
 Crepidium megalanthum
 Crepidium melanophyllum
 Crepidium merapiense
 Crepidium merrillii
 Crepidium metallicum
 Crepidium micholitzianum
 Crepidium micranthum
 Crepidium microhybos
 Crepidium mieczyslawii
 Crepidium mindorense
 Crepidium multiflorum
 Crepidium myosotis

n 
 Crepidium negrosianum 
 Crepidium nemorale 
 Crepidium nephroglossum 
 Crepidium nigrescens 
 Crepidium nitidum

o 
 Crepidium obovatum
 Crepidium ochyranum
 Crepidium octodentatum
 Crepidium oculatum
 Crepidium oliganthum
 Crepidium olivaceum
 Crepidium orbicans
 Crepidium orbiculare
 Crepidium oreocharis
 Crepidium ovalisepalum

p 
 Crepidium paguroides
 Crepidium palawense
 Crepidium parryae
 Crepidium partitilobum
 Crepidium pectinatum
 Crepidium pedicellare
 Crepidium perakense
 Crepidium petiolare
 Crepidium platychilum
 Crepidium pleistanthum
 Crepidium polyodon
 Crepidium prasinum
 Crepidium productum
 Crepidium propinquum
 Crepidium protractum
 Crepidium puberulum
 Crepidium pubicallosum
 Crepidium punctatum
 Crepidium purpureonervosum
 Crepidium purpureoviridis
 Crepidium purpureum

q 
 Crepidium quadridens 
 Crepidium quadridentatum
 Crepidium quadrilobum

r 
 Crepidium raciborskii
 Crepidium rajanum
 Crepidium ramosum
 Crepidium ranauense
 Crepidium ravanii
 Crepidium reineckeanum
 Crepidium repens
 Crepidium resupinatum
 Crepidium retusum
 Crepidium rhabdophyllum
 Crepidium rheedei
 Crepidium rhinoceros
 Crepidium ridleyanum
 Crepidium ridleyi
 Crepidium riparium
 Crepidium robinsonii

s 
 Crepidium saccatum
 Crepidium sagittatum
 Crepidium sagittiflorum
 Crepidium samoense
 Crepidium saprophytum
 Crepidium schlechteri
 Crepidium schumannianum
 Crepidium sciaphilum
 Crepidium segaarense
 Crepidium seidenfadenianum
 Crepidium seleniglossum
 Crepidium setipes
 Crepidium sichuanicum
 Crepidium slamatense
 Crepidium soleiforme
 Crepidium sororium
 Crepidium stenophyllum
 Crepidium stenostachys
 Crepidium stolleanum
 Crepidium sublobatum
 Crepidium sumatrense
 Crepidium sundaicum
 Crepidium szlachetkianum

t 
 Crepidium taurinum
 Crepidium taylorii
 Crepidium tenggerense
 Crepidium ternatense
 Crepidium tetralobum
 Crepidium tixieri
 Crepidium tjiwideiense
 Crepidium torricellense
 Crepidium toxopei
 Crepidium trichopodum
 Crepidium tripartitum
 Crepidium triphyllum
 Crepidium trukense
 Crepidium tubulosum

u 
 Crepidium umbonatum 
 Crepidium umbraticola 
 Crepidium uncatum 
 Crepidium undulatum

v 
 Crepidium van-royenii
 Crepidium variabile
 Crepidium venosum
 Crepidium vermeulenianum
 Crepidium verruculosum
 Crepidium vinicolor
 Crepidium vinosum
 Crepidium vitiense

w 
 Crepidium wappeanum
 Crepidium warapussae
 Crepidium warianum
 Crepidium wenzelii
 Crepidium werneri
 Crepidium williamsii
 Crepidium woodianum

x 
 Crepidium xanthochilum

y 
 Crepidium yamapense

z 
 Crepidium zippelii

References

External links 
 
 

 List of species
Crepidium